Grŵp Colegau NPTC Group of Colleges is a further education college which was formed following the merger of Neath Port Talbot College and Coleg Powys on 1 August 2013.

The college offers a programme of full-time, part-time, and higher education courses across its 8 campuses in Wales.

Provision 
NPTC Group offers a wide range of further education courses including A levels, BTECs and other vocational courses; the college offers higher education and part-time courses, including certificates, diplomas, BSc and BAs. NPTC Group of Colleges is a collaborative partner of the University of South Wales, The University of Wales Trinity Saint David, Wrexham Glyndŵr University, and Pearson.

Former students 
Some notable former students include Michael Sheen, Dan Lydiate, Ashley Beck, James Hook, Justin Tipuric, Duncan Jones and Paul James.

References

External links 
 NPTC Group Official website

Buildings and structures in Neath Port Talbot
Education in Neath Port Talbot
Education in Powys
Further education colleges in Wales
Further education colleges in Powys
Further education colleges in Neath Port Talbot